Derby South is a constituency formed of part of the city of Derby represented in the House of Commons of the UK Parliament since 1983 by veteran MP Margaret Beckett of the Labour Party. She has served under the Labour governments of Harold Wilson, James Callaghan, Tony Blair and Gordon Brown. She became interim Leader of the Labour Party in 1994 when John Smith suddenly died. She has also served under Neil Kinnock and Smith himself.

Boundaries 

1950–1955: The County Borough of Derby wards of Alvaston, Arboretum, Castle, Dale, Litchurch, Normanton, Osmaston, and Peartree.

1955–1974: The County Borough of Derby wards of Alvaston, Arboretum, Castle, Dale, Litchurch, Normanton, Osmaston, and Peartree, and the parish of Littleover in the Rural District of Shardlow.

1974–1983: The County Borough of Derby wards of Alvaston, Arboretum, Babington, Chellaston, Litchurch, Littleover, Normanton, Osmaston, and Peartree.

1983–1997: The City of Derby wards of Alvaston, Babington, Blagreaves, Kingsway, Litchurch, Littleover, Normanton, Osmaston, and Sinfin.

1997–2010: The City of Derby wards of Alvaston, Babington, Blagreaves, Kingsway, Litchurch, Littleover, Mickleover, Normanton, Osmaston, and Sinfin.

2010–present: The City of Derby wards of Alvaston, Arboretum, Blagreaves, Boulton, Chellaston, Normanton, and Sinfin.

Derby city centre has been in this constituency since 1974; from 1950 it had been in Derby North.

The proposals made by the Boundary Commission in 2016 for new constituencies would have seen the wards Aston, Chaddesden, Spondon and Oakwood move into the seat while the wards Arboretum, Normanton and Blagreaves would move to the seat of Derby North.  This would notionally make the seat a Conservative seat.  If implemented, this would be the first time the city centre has been in Derby North since 1974.

Members of Parliament

Constituency profile
The constituency takes in Derby city centre including much of its varied income inner-city, a narrow majority of which used to be local council-built however which is offset by conservation areas including beside Derby Cathedral and Derby Catacombs. The remainder of the seat is generally more affluent suburbs, and much of the engineering industry traditionally associated with the city.

History 
The constituency was created in 1950, when the former two-seat constituency of Derby was split into two single-member seats. Unlike the Derby North seat, this seat has to date been a Labour Party seat.

A notable former MP for the seat was its first incumbent, Philip Noel-Baker of the Labour Party. He served as a Cabinet minister in the post-war Attlee government, and was awarded the Nobel Peace Prize in 1959 for his campaigning for disarmament. He had previously represented the former two-seat constituency of Derby since a by-election in 1936.

The former Cabinet minister Margaret Beckett, who had represented Lincoln (under her maiden name of Margaret Jackson) from 1974 to 1979, has represented Derby South for the Labour Party since 1983. At that election Beckett won the seat with one of the smallest majorities seen of just 421 over the Conservative Party, since which she has achieved only larger majorities than this. The most recent result, in line with other Leave-voting seats, is a reduced majority for Labour, with both the Conservative and Liberal Democrat candidates increasing their vote share, however Beckett still won a majority (51%) of all votes cast, higher than in the elections between 2005 and 2015, suggesting the seat is a relatively safe seat for the Labour Party.

Elections

Elections in the 2010s

The vote share changes on 2005 and the turnout figures were notional based on boundary changes.

Elections in the 2000s

Elections in the 1990s

Elections in the 1980s

Elections in the 1970s

Elections in the 1960s

Elections in the 1950s

See also 
 List of parliamentary constituencies in Derbyshire

Notes

References

Parliamentary constituencies in Derbyshire
Politics of Derby
Constituencies of the Parliament of the United Kingdom established in 1950